Jajui-ye Sofla (also Romanized as Jājūī-ye Soflá; also known as Jājū Soflá and Jājū-ye Soflá) is a village in Jahangiri Rural District, in the Central District of Masjed Soleyman County, Khuzestan Province, Iran. At the 2006 census, its population was 36, in 9 families.

References 

Populated places in Masjed Soleyman County